In differential geometry, Pu's inequality, proved by Pao Ming Pu, relates the area of an arbitrary Riemannian surface homeomorphic to the real projective plane with the lengths of the closed curves contained in it.

Statement
A student of Charles Loewner, Pu proved in his 1950 thesis  that every Riemannian surface  homeomorphic to the real projective plane satisfies the inequality

 

The equality is attained precisely when the metric has constant Gaussian curvature.

In other words, if all noncontractible loops in  have length at least , then  and the equality holds if and only if  is obtained from a Euclidean sphere of radius  by identifying each point with its antipodal.

Pu's paper also stated for the first time Loewner's inequality, a similar result for Riemannian metrics on the torus.

Proof 
Pu's original proof relies on the uniformization theorem and employs an averaging argument, as follows.

By uniformization, the Riemannian surface  is conformally diffeomorphic to a round projective plane. This means that we may assume that the surface  is obtained from the Euclidean unit sphere  by identifying antipodal points, and the Riemannian length element at each point  is

where  is the Euclidean length element and the function , called the conformal factor, satisfies .

Subject to the restriction that each of these lengths is at least , we want to find an  that minimizes the 

where  is the upper half of the sphere.

A key observation is that if we average several different  that satisfy the length restriction and have the same area , then we obtain a better conformal factor , that also satisfies the length restriction and has

and the inequality is strict unless the functions  are equal.

A way to improve any non-constant  is to obtain the different functions  from  using rotations of the sphere , defining . If we average over all possible rotations, then we get an  that is constant over all the sphere. We can further reduce this constant to minimum value  allowed by the length restriction. Then we obtain the obtain the unique metric that attains the minimum area .

Reformulation

Alternatively, every metric on the sphere  invariant under the antipodal map admits a pair of opposite points  at Riemannian distance  satisfying 

A more detailed explanation of this viewpoint may be found at the page Introduction to systolic geometry.

Filling area conjecture

An alternative formulation of Pu's inequality is the following.  Of all possible fillings of the Riemannian circle of length  by a -dimensional disk with the strongly isometric property, the round hemisphere has the least area.

To explain this formulation, we start with the observation that the equatorial circle of the unit -sphere  is a Riemannian circle  of length .  More precisely, the Riemannian distance function
Note that this property is not satisfied by the standard imbedding of the unit circle in the Euclidean plane. Indeed, the Euclidean distance between a pair of opposite points of the circle is

metric of a circle of length .  The inclusion of the circle as the boundary is then called a strongly isometric imbedding of the circle.

Gromov conjectured that the round hemisphere gives the "best" way of filling the circle even when the filling surface is allowed to have positive genus .

Isoperimetric inequality

Pu's inequality bears a curious resemblance to the classical isoperimetric inequality 

for Jordan curves in the plane, where  is the length of the curve while  is the area of the region it bounds.  Namely, in both cases a 2-dimensional quantity (area) is bounded by (the square of) a 1-dimensional quantity (length).  However, the inequality goes in the opposite direction.  Thus, Pu's inequality can be thought of as an 
"opposite" isoperimetric inequality.

See also
Filling area conjecture
Gromov's systolic inequality for essential manifolds
Gromov's inequality for complex projective space
Loewner's torus inequality
Systolic geometry
Systoles of surfaces

References
 
 
 
 
 

Riemannian geometry
Geometric inequalities
Differential geometry of surfaces
Systolic geometry